The 1923 Minneapolis Marines season was their third in the league. The team improved on their previous output of 1–3, winning two games. They finished 13th in the league.

Schedule

Standings

References

Minneapolis Marines seasons
Minneapolis Marines
Marines